The 1947 U.S. Women's Open was the second U.S. Women's Open, held June 26−29 at Starmount Forest Country Club in Greensboro, North Carolina.

Betty Jameson won her only U.S. Women's Open, six strokes ahead of runners-up Polly Riley and Sally Sessions, both amateurs. She entered the final round on Sunday with a two shot lead at 225 (−3) and carded a six-under 70. It was the second of her three major championships. Jameson was the runner-up the previous year, conducted in a match play format. Defending champion Patty Berg finished ninth, third among the professionals.

Final leaderboard
Sunday, June 29, 1947

Source:

References

External links
USGA final leaderboard
U.S. Women's Open Golf Championship
U.S. Women's Open – past champions – 1947

U.S. Women's Open
Golf in North Carolina
Sports competitions in Greensboro, North Carolina
U.S. Women's Open
U.S. Women's Open
U.S. Women's Open
U.S. Women's Open
Women's sports in North Carolina